Jean-Marie Claveau was a Canadian politician. He was a member of the National Assembly of Quebec for the riding of Dubuc, first elected in the 2012 election. He was defeated in the 2014 election.

References

Living people
Parti Québécois MNAs
People from Saguenay–Lac-Saint-Jean
21st-century Canadian politicians
Year of birth missing (living people)